Hubert Rakotombelontsoa is a Malagasy Olympic hurdler. He represented his country in the men's 400 metres hurdles at the 1992 Summer Olympics. His time was a 51.54 in the hurdles.

References

1968 births
Living people
Malagasy male hurdlers
Olympic athletes of Madagascar
Athletes (track and field) at the 1992 Summer Olympics